is a platform arcade video game developed by Face and originally published by SNK on September 1, 2001. Starring the eponymous creature, players are tasked with travelling through nine stages, throwing small creatures called Zooks, jumping on and off platforms to navigate level obstacles while dodging and defeating monsters. Although first launched in arcades, the game has been re-released through download services for various consoles. The title has gained a cult following since its initial release.

Gameplay 

ZuPaPa! is a platform game reminiscent of Bubble Bobble and Snow Bros., where players assume the role of star-like creatures ZuPaPa (P1) and ZuPiPi (P2) through various stages, each with a boss at the end that must be fought before progressing any further.

Each player can throw small creatures called Zooks at enemies until each one is completely covered and turns into a star bomb, which defeats any enemy that comes into contact with it. The more Zooks are thrown against an enemy, the larger the attack range becomes. Defeated enemies may drop an items or power-ups such as speed increasers and bonus points. Players have to complete every level within a specific period of time before exceeding an invisible timer. If the players do not manage to eliminate all the enemies in time, an angry alarm clock ringing loudly and a devil creature appears.

Getting hit by enemy fire or if the devil manages to touch ZuPaPa or ZuPiPi before all enemies are eliminated will result in losing a life, as well as a penalty of decreasing the characters' firepower and speed to their original state and once all lives are lost, the game is over unless the players insert more credits into the arcade machine to continue playing.

Development and release 
ZuPaPa! was developed by Face and was first showcased to the public at the 1994 AOU Show in addition to being previewed through various publications, however the game was never released until SNK published it in September 2001, just nearly a month before the bankruptcy of the company. The title has since received a re-release by Hamster Corporation in recent years on digital distribution platforms such as the Nintendo eShop, PlayStation Network and Xbox Live.

Reception 
IGN Italias Andrea Corritore regarded ZuPaPa! to be a "cult title". Chris Moyse of Destructoid praised the sprite work but noted the gameplay to be "anachronistic". Both Hobby Consolas and Meristation noted its similarity with Snow Bros.

Notes

References

External links 
 ZuPaPa! at GameFAQs
 ZuPaPa! at Giant Bomb
 ZuPaPa! at Killer List of Videogames
 ZuPaPa! at MobyGames

2001 video games
ACA Neo Geo games
Arcade video games
Face (company) games
Multiplayer and single-player video games
Neo Geo games
Nintendo Switch games
PlayStation Network games
PlayStation 4 games
Platform games
SNK games
Windows games
Xbox One games
Video games developed in Japan
Hamster Corporation games